Cadmium chromate is the inorganic compound with the formula CdCrO4.  It is relevant to chromate conversion coating, which is used to passivate common metal alloys such as aluminum, zinc, cadmium, copper, silver, magnesium, and tin.  In conversion coating chromate reacts with these metals to prevent corrosion, retain electrical conductivity, and provide a finish for the appearance of the final alloy products.  This process is commonly used on hardware and tool items.  Chromate species take on their distinctive yellow color when coated.

References

Cadmium compounds
Chromates